Abu Sa'id ibn Abi al-Hasan Yasar al-Basri, often referred to as Hasan of Basra (Arabic: الحسن البصري, romanized: Al-Ḥasan al-Baṣrī; 642 - 15 October 728) for short, or as Hasan al-Basri, was an early Muslim preacher, ascetic, theologian, exegete, scholar, judge, and mystic. Born in Medina in 642, Hasan belonged to the second generation of Muslims, all of whom would subsequently be referred to as the tābiʿūn in Sunni Islamic piety. In fact, Hasan rose to become one of "the most celebrated" of the tābiʿūn, enjoying an "acclaimed scholarly career and an even more remarkable posthumous legacy in Islamic scholarship."

Hasan, revered for his austerity and support for "renunciation" (zuhd), preached against worldliness and materialism during the early days of the Umayyad Caliphate, with his passionate sermons casting a "deep impression on his contemporaries." His close relationships with several of the most prominent companions of the prophet Muhammad only strengthened his standing as a teacher and scholar of the Islamic sciences. The particular disciplines in which he is said to have excelled included exegesis (tafsīr) of the Quran,  whence his "name is invariably encountered in" classical and medieval commentaries on the scripture, as well as theology and mysticism.  Regarding the last of these, it is important to note that Hasan became a tremendously important figure in the development of Sufism with his name occurring "in many mystical silsilas (chains of teachers and their disciples) going back to Muḥammad" in the writings of Sunni mystics from the ninth-century onwards. In the words of one scholar, Hasan stands as the "great patriarch" of early Sufism.

As scholars have noted, very few of Hasan's original writings survive, with his proverbs and maxims on various subjects having been transmitted primarily through oral tradition by his numerous disciples. While fragments of his famed sermons do survive in the works of later authors, the only complete manuscripts that bear his name are apocryphal works such as the Risālat al-qadar ilā ʿAbd al-Malik (Epistle to ʿAbd al-Malik against the Predestinarians), a pseudopigraphical text from the ninth or early-tenth century, and another letter "of an ascetic and hortatory character" addressed to Umar II (d. 720), which is likewise deemed spurious.

Traditionally, Hasan has been commemorated as an outstanding figure by all the Sunni schools of thought, and was frequently designated as one of the well respected  of the early Islamic community in later writings by such important Sunni thinkers as Abu Talib al-Makki (d. 996), Abu Nu`aym (d. 1038), Ali Hujwiri (d. 1077), Ibn al-Jawzi (d. 1201), and Attar of Nishapur (d. 1221). In his famed Ḳūt al-ḳulūb, the most important work of Basran Sunni mysticism, Abu Talib al-Makki says of Hasan: "Ḥasan is our Imām in this doctrine which we represent. We walk in his footsteps and we follow his ways and from his lamp we have our light" (wa ’l-Ḥasanu raḥimahu ’llāhu imāmunā fī hād̲h̲a ’l-ʿilmi ’llad̲h̲ī natakallamu bih , at̲h̲arahu naḳfū wa sabīlahū natbaʿu wa min mis̲h̲kātihi nastaḍīʾ).

Life
Hasan was born in Medina in 642 CE. His mother, Khayra, is said to have been a maidservant of one of the prophet Muhammad's wives, Umm Salama (d. 683), while his father, Peroz, was a Persian slave who originally hailed from southern Iraq. According to tradition, Hasan grew up in Medina for the vast portion of his early life, prior to his family's move to Basra after the Battle of Siffin. According to some scholars, it is "primarily this association with Medina and his acquaintance there with many of the notable Companions and wives of Muḥammad that elevated [Hasan's] importance as an authoritative figure in Muslim religious and historical genealogy."

The various extant biographies relate that Hasan was once nursed by Umm Salama, and that his mother took him after his birth to the caliph Umar (d. 644), who is related to have blessed him with the prayer: "O God! Please do make him wise in the faith and beloved to all people." As he grew, Hasan began to be widely admired for his uncompromising faithfulness to the example of Muhammad. The various early sources on Hasan's life relate that he frequently studied at the feet of Ali (d. 661) during this period, who is said to have taught Hasan while the latter was still "an adolescent." As there is evidence that the metaphysical idea of the abdal – forty major saints whose number, according to traditional Sunni mystical belief, is believed to remain constant till the Day of Judgment, with each group of forty being replaced by another upon their earthly death – was prevalent at the time, there are traditions which relate that some of Hasan's contemporaries did indeed identify him as one of the abdal of that period.

As a young man, Hasan took part in the campaigns of conquest in eastern Iran (ca. 663) and worked as a jewel-merchant, prior to forsaking the business and military life for that of a pure ascetic and scholar. It was during this latter period that he openly began to criticize the policies of the governors in Iraq, even stirring up the authorities to such a degree that he actually had to flee for the safety of his life under the reign of Ḥaj̲j̲āj, whose anger Hasan had roused due to his forthright condemnation of Ḥaj̲j̲āj's founding of Wāsiṭ in 705. One of Hasan's closest companions from this period was his fellow ascetic and mystic Farqad as-Sabakhi (d. 729), an Armenian Christian convert to Islam. Together with figures like as-Sabakhi and Rabia Basri (d. 801), Hasan began to publicly denounce the accumulation of riches by the wealthy; and it is said that he personally despised wealth to such a degree that he even "rejected a suitor for his daughter's hand who was famous for his wealth simply because of his riches." It was during this period, moreover, that Hasan is said to have taken numerous disciples in mysticism,  such as Habib al-Ajami (d. ca. 8th century), whose relationship with Hasan is documented in various hagiographies. Hasan died in Basra in 728, being eighty-six years old. According to a tradition quoted by the medieval traditionist Qushayri (d. 1074), "on the night of al-Hasan al-Basri’s death ... [a local man] saw in a dream that the Gates of Heaven were opened and a crier announced: 'Verily, al-Hasan al-Basri is coming to God Most High, Who is pleased with him.'"

Views
As one scholar has explained, the essence of Hasan's message was "otherworldliness, abstinence, poverty, and reverential fear of God, although he also spoke of the knowledge and love of God, which he contrasted with love and knowledge of the world."

Mysticism
Although none of Hasan's own complete writings on mysticism survive, it is recognized that he "instructed several generations of students in both the religious sciences and what was soon to become known as Sufism." As such, he has been referred to as both "the great patriarch" of Sufism and "the patriarch of Muslim mysticism" by Western scholars. Indeed, it may very well be that Hasan never actually wrote any complete works on the subject, as none of his works in other disciplines survive either; rather, what is far more probable, as scholars have noted, is that he passed down his teachings orally. From the fragments of his sermons available to us in later Islamic works, it is clear that one of the primary aspects of Hasan's mysticism was his strong support for asceticism and otherworldliness. This characteristic is highlighted in some of his most famous epigrams, such as: "Exist in this world as if you had never set foot here, and in the next world as if you had never left it." Another of his most ubiquitous sayings is: "He that knoweth God loveth Him, and he that knoweth the world abstaineth from it," which, according to one scholar, represents the "very quintessence of Sufism" in Basra at the time. In another of his famous maxims, Hasan stated: "The [visionary] onlooker thinketh that they are sick, but no sickness hath smitten that folk. Or, if thou wilt, they are smitten: overwhelmingly smitten by remembrance of the Hereafter," which, according to one scholar, "mentions the possibility of seeing clearly the next life whilst still in this and describes the lasting imprint of this foretaste." As scholars have noted, Hasan spoke of "such visionaries objectively" despite it being clear that he knew himself to be one of them. In the words of one scholar, Hasan's famous mystical extortions "still echo in Persian, Turkish, and Pashto mystical verses" many centuries later.

Hasan has been described as "an outstanding intermediary figure" in Sufi history, for although "he grew up in the apostolic age [the age of the ṣaḥābah],"  the nature of the mystical body in early Islam had changed "by the time of his own death at the age of 86,"  by which point "the mystics of Islam had become a distinct class." According to traditional Sunni mystical works, Hasan learnt a great deal of his inward knowledge from Ali, which is why "many of the Sufi orders trace their spiritual descent back to 'Ali, and thus to the Prophet" through Hasan.

Prayer-beads
Hasan is said to have advocated the use of prayer beads (Arabic: misbaḥah; Persian, Turkish, and Urdu: tasbīḥ) during the remembrance of God. It is related by al-Suyuti (d. 1505) that Hasan said, with regard to the use of prayer beads, "Something we have used at the beginning of the road we are not desirous to leave at the end. I love to remember God with my heart, my hand, and my tongue." On this, al-Suyuti commented: "And how should it be otherwise, when the dhikr-beads remind one of God Most High, and a person seldom sees dhikr-beads except he remembers God, which is among the greatest of its benefits." As a result of the example of early teachers like Hasan, the use of prayer beads is very common in mainstream Sunni and Shia Islam; the practice is, however, often opposed by some proponents of Salafism and Wahhabism for being a heretical innovation in the religion.

Hagiographic traditions
Islamic hagiography contains numerous widespread traditions and anecdotes relating to Hasan. One of the most famous of these is the story of his conversion, which "relates that the great ascetic began his adult life as a successful jewel-merchant." The hagiographic scholar John Renard summarizes the narrative thus: "Hasan once visited the Byzantine Emperor's court, and the vizier invited him to travel with him into the desert. There Hasan saw a lavish tent, to which came in succession a large army, four hundred scholars, elders, and four hundred beautiful servant maids. The vizier explained that each year since the Emperor's handsome young son had died of an illness, these throngs of Byzantine subjects had come to pay respects to the dead prince. After all these categories of royal subjects had entered and departed, the Emperor and his chief minister would go into the tent and explain to the deceased boy, in turn, how it grieved them that neither their might, nor learning, nor wisdom, nor wealth and beauty, nor authority had been sufficient to prolong his promising life. The striking scene persuaded Hasan of the need to be ever mindful of his mortality, and he was transformed from a prosperous businessman into a veritable archetype of the world-renouncing ascetic."

Hasan's relationship with Muhammad
Some hagiographic sources even indicate that Hasan actually met the prophet Muhammad as an infant. The tradition relates that Muhammad, who "visited Umm Salama's house while the baby was there," "prayed for little Hasan and again bestowed blessings." On another occasion, the child Hasan is said to have drunk some water from Muhammad's water jug. When Muhammad learned that Hasan had drunk the water, he is said to have "declared that the boy would receive knowledge from him in proportion to the water he had imbibed."

Characteristics
According to various historical sources, it is said that Hasan was admired by his contemporaries for his handsome appearance. In this connection, Ibn Qayyim al-Jawziyya (d. 1350) relates an older tradition, which states: "A group of women went out on the day of Eid and went about looking at people. They were asked: 'Who is the most handsome person you have seen today?' They replied: 'It is a teacher wearing a black turban.' They meant al-Ḥasan al-Baṣrī." As for his personality, it is related that Hasan was a frequent weeper, being known by those around him "for the abundance of tears he shed out of compunction for his sins." One particular tradition relates that he wept so much praying on his rooftop one day that his abundant tears began to run off "through the downspouts upon a passerby, who inquired whether the water was clean." Hasan immediately called out to the man below, telling him "it was not, for these were sinner's tears." As such, "he advised the passerby to wash himself forthwith." In a similar vein, Qushayri related of Hasan: "One would never see al-Hasan al-Basri without thinking that he had just been afflicted with a terrible tragedy." With regard to these traditions, one scholar noted that it is evident that Hasan "was deeply steeped in the sadness and fear so typical of ascetics of all religions."

See also

 Maruf Karkhi
 Nasr Abu Zayd
 Sufism
 Chishti Order
 Alevism
 Bektashi

References

Further reading

Primary
 Ibn al-Murtaḍā, Ṭabaḳāt al-Muʿtazila, ed. Susanna Wilzer (Bibl. Isl. 21), 18 ff.
 Ibn Ḳutayba, ʿUyūn al-ak̲h̲bār, Cairo 1925, index
 Ibn K̲h̲allikān, no. 155
 S̲h̲ahrastānī, al-Milal wa ’l-nihal, ed. Cureton, 32
 Abū Ṭālib al-Makkī, Ḳūt al-ḳulūb, Cairo 1310, Passim
 Abū Nuʿaym, Ḥilyat al-awliyāʾ, Cairo 1932-8, passim
 Ḥud̲j̲wīrī, Kas̲h̲f al-maḥj̲ūb, tr. R. A. Nicholson, GMS xvii, 86 f.
 Farīd al-Dīn ʿAṭṭār, Tad̲h̲kirat al-awliyāʾ, ed. Nicholson, i, 24 ff.
 Ibn al-Jawzī, Ādāb Ḥasan al-Baṣrī, Cairo 1931
 Ak̲h̲bār Ḥasan al-Baṣrī, ms. Ẓāhiriyya, Damascus, cf. Fihris (Taʾrīk̲h̲), 306 (not seen)
 Jāḥiẓ, al-Bayān wa ’l-tabyīn, Cairo 1949, index
 Jamharat rasāʾil al-ʿArab, ed. Aḥmad Zakī Ṣafwat, Cairo 1937, i, 378-89.

Secondary
 L. Massignon, Essai sur les origines du lexique technique de la mystique musulmane, Paris 1922, 152-75
 H. H. Schaeder, "Ḥasan al-Baṣrī," in Isl., xiv (1925), 42 ff.
 H. Ritter, "Studien zur Geschichte der islamischen Frŏmmigkeit, i, Hasan el-Basri," in Isl., xxi (1933), 1-83
 J. Obermann, Political theory in early Islam, Publications of the American Oriental Society, Offprint series no. 6, 1935
 J. Renard, Friends of God: Islamic images of piety, commitment, and servanthood, Berkeley 2008, index

External links

Tabi‘un
Tabi‘un hadith narrators
People from Basra
Mujaddid
Scholars from the Umayyad Caliphate
Sunni imams
Sunni Sufis
Muslim saints
8th-century Muslim theologians
Sunni Muslim scholars of Islam
8th-century Persian-language writers
8th-century Arabic writers
7th-century Arabic writers
642 births
728 deaths